Asannagari Jeevana Reddy (born 7 March 1976) is an Indian politician and a member of the Legislative Assembly from Armur, Telangana. He won the 2014 Indian general election on Telangana Rashtra Samithi ticket from Armur.

He was the Telangana Rashtra Samithi, 2014 Indian general election first declared MLA candidate on 13 May 2014, the auspicious day of Akshaya Tritiya for Armur. In the same election, Telangana Rashtra Samithi went on to win its highest number of seats in the Legislative Assembly of the newly formed state Telangana and thereby formed the government.

Early life
Jeevan Reddy was born in a middle-class agricultural family with political background in Jankampet village of Nizamabad district of Telangana to Venkat Rajanna, who was Village Upasarpanch (Congress). He graduated from Osmania University with L.L.B. He is also a member of the Bar Council of Nizamabad. His uncle, late Yalla Ramulu was M. P. P. in Armur, Nizamabad district (Congress).

Political career

Jeevan Reddy was announced as the first Telangana Rashtra Samithi MLA Candidate for the 2014 Indian general election from Armur.
Jeevan Reddy won with a majority of around 13,000 votes over K. R. Suresh Reddy of Indian National Congress and the party went on to form its first Government by winning 63 of the 119 seats under the leadership of Chief Minister of Telangana Kalvakuntla Chandrashekar Rao Garu.

He was a part of the five-member delegation to Singapore and Malaysia the first ever foreign visit of Hon'ble Chief Minister of Telangana Shri Kalvakuntla Chandrashekar Rao Garu, Telangana Finance Minister Etela Rajender and few other MLAs. He also visited Kerala State, Tiruvanantpuram Mandal to study the organisational structure of ISO-certified gram panchayats with K. T. Rama Rao. He has also taken an active part with the party leaders in Delhi during the Parliament Sessions of the introduction of the Telangana. 

He is a well-known speaker on behalf of the Telangana Rashtra Samithi and has attended numerous debates and live discussions on almost every popular news channel to speak on behalf of the Telangana Government.

Constituency development

He is the first MLA in Telangana and among most Indian states to implement a 24/7 toll free number for the people of his constituency and he constantly keeps in touch with his people through various social networking media. In a short span of 3 months after coming to power he has started a prestigious drinking water project from Pochampadu to Armur as promised by him during his election campaign and was inaugurated by Honorable Chief Minister Kalvakuntla Chandrashekar Rao. He has also made the Government to sanction Rs 115 million dues to red jowar farmers which have been pending for more than a decade. Under his term, Armoor has been marked as a revenue division of Nizamabad district which also has been a long awaited demand for the people of his constituency.

Within a short span of six months after swearing in he has been responsible for a vast range of development programs in his constituency which include drinking water pipeline worth ₹4 billion inaugurated by Chief Minister of Telangana, Kalvakuntla Chandrashekar Rao his first ever visit to any constituency after forming the Government and his first-ever project as a part of Telangana water grid scheme. Ironically he is also the first declared MLA candidate for the party and his constituency is the first to be visited after Kalvakuntla Chandrashekar Rao Garu has become the Chief Minister of Telangana and he is also the part of KCR Garus first-ever foreign visit.

Separate community halls for the people of 13 different castes, two-wheelers to the fishermen, super fine rice midday meal to the hostel students, Loan waiver to 8,000 plus agriculture families, ration cards to 22,000 plus families, pension of ₹1000 to widows and ₹1500 to handicapped, 6 kg rice per person in a family for a subsidised price to white ration card holders, construction of CC roads of 300 km length.

Sanction of bridge above Godavari River connecting Nizamabad district's Nandipet Mandal of Armur with Adilabad district worth Rs. 900 million which is on demand for more than 4 decades now has been fulfilled by him. Sanction of Rs. 115 million due for more than a decade to red jowar farmers from previous governments, sanction of 100-bed hospital to Armur, encouraging establishment of several shopping malls and restaurants in his constituency as a part of urbanisation and so on.

Chief Minister of Telangana, Kalvakuntla Chandrashekar Rao has visited Ankapur Village of Armur constituency, his first-ever visit to any village after forming the Government. Ankapur which is a model village for agriculture has several specialities like Country Chicken and has esteemed agriculture families growing Turmeric and Tobacco. He has made many significant contributions for the development of this village and make it useful to other villages by implementation of advanced techniques including usage of drones in vast stretches of agricultural land to study the nature of the soil and its fertility.

In the media
Jeevan Reddy is popular in the media because of his frequent appearance in the media. He is a well known speaker and extensively takes part in News debates on almost all popular channels of Telangana like T News, V6 News, TV 9, TV 5, N TV, Sakshi TV, HMTV etc. He mostly appears in the early-morning shows between 7 am to 9 am.

References

1976 births
Living people
Telangana politicians
People from Telangana
Telangana Rashtra Samithi politicians
People from Nizamabad district
Telangana MLAs 2014–2018
Telangana MLAs 2018–2023